Son of the Mask is a 2005 superhero comedy film directed by Lawrence Guterman. A stand-alone sequel to The Mask (1994), it is the second installment in The Mask franchise, an adaptation of the comic book series of the same name by Dark Horse Comics. The film stars Jamie Kennedy as Tim Avery, an aspiring animator from Fringe City who has just had his first child born with the powers of the Mask. It also stars Alan Cumming as Loki, whom Odin has ordered to find the Mask. It co-stars Traylor Howard, Kal Penn, Steven Wright, Bob Hoskins as Odin, and Ryan and Liam Falconer as Tim's baby Alvey. Ben Stein makes a brief reappearance at the beginning of the film as Doctor Arthur Neuman from the original film. The film was a critical and financial failure upon release, grossing $59.9 million against its $84–100 million budget.

Plot 
Doctor Arthur Neuman is giving a tour of the hall of Norse mythology in Edge City's local museum. Neuman mentions that Loki, the God of Mischief, created the mask and unleashed it on Earth to spread chaos among mankind, and that those who wear it are granted his powers. When Neuman mentions Loki's imprisonment at his father Odin's hands, a stranger becomes furious and transforms, revealing himself to be Loki. The tourists panic and flee, but Neuman stays to argue with Loki, who takes the mask in the display case, only to realize it is a replica. In anger, he removes Neuman's face and puts it in the case, disposes of the arriving authorities, and storms out of the museum.

In Fringe City, the real mask is found in a river by a dog named Otis, who belongs to Tim Avery. An aspiring animator, Tim is reluctant to accept parenthood with his wife, Tonya. On a tropical island, Loki is relaxing until Odin orders him to resume the search for the mask, believing it has caused too much chaos for mankind. Loki asks his father for help, but Odin says that he has to take responsibility for his actions. Tim puts on the mask for his studio's Halloween party, and becomes a green-faced party animal who can magically alter his surroundings. When the party turns out to be a bore, Tim uses his newfound powers to perform a remix of "Can't Take My Eyes Off You", invigorating the event and giving Tim's boss, Daniel Moss, the inspiration for a new cartoon.

That night, Tim returns to his house and has sex with Tonya, while still wearing the mask. A baby is conceived, and is born with the same powers as the mask, which alerts Odin. Possessing a store clerk, Odin informs Loki and tells him that if he finds the child, he will find the mask. Months later, Tonya goes on a business trip, leaving Tim with their son Alvey. Tim, now promoted, desperately tries to work on his cartoon at home, but is continuously disrupted by Alvey. To get some peace and quiet, Tim lets Alvey watch various cartoons on television, which inspire Alvey to torment his father using his powers. Otis, who has been feeling neglected by Tim, accidentally dons the mask, gains its power, and tries to get rid of Alvey, but his attempts are foiled by the craftier infant.

Leaving a trail of mayhem in his wake, Loki finds Alvey and confronts Tim for the mask, but Alvey uses his powers to protect his father. Odin, possessing Tim's body, scolds Loki's destructive approach and strips him of his powers. Tim is later fired after failing to impress Moss during a pitch but reconciles and bonds with Alvey. Loki, determined to please his father, sneaks into the Avery household and completes a summoning ritual and appeals to Odin to restore his powers. Odin agrees, but only for a limited time, stating this is his last chance.

Loki kidnaps Alvey in exchange for the mask. Tonya returns home and goes with Tim and Otis, to whom Tim had apologized for his negligence, to make the exchange. Loki decides to keep Alvey despite the exchange, forcing the group to chase after them as Tim becomes the Mask once more. The subsequent confrontation is relatively evenly matched, prompting Loki to halt the fight, suggesting they let Alvey decide who to be with. Although Loki tries to lure Alvey to him with promises of fun, Tim takes the mask off and convinces his son to choose him. Enraged, Loki tries to kill Tim, but his time runs out and Odin appears in person, again scolding Loki for his failure. Tim, however, feels sympathy for Loki and reminds Odin that regardless of their problems, they are still family. Odin reconciles with Loki, and the duo returns home.

Some time later, Tim is rehired when his cartoon, based on Alvey and Otis competing for his attention, becomes a success. After the Avery family watches the cartoon's premiere, Tonya reveals that she is pregnant again.

Cast 

 Jamie Kennedy as Tim Avery / The Mask
 Alan Cumming as Loki
 Traylor Howard as Tonya Avery
 Kal Penn as Jorge
 Steven Wright as Daniel Moss
 Bob Hoskins as Odin
 Ben Stein as Doctor Arthur Neuman
 Magda Szubanski as Betty
 Sandy Winton as Chris
 Rebecca Massey as Clare
 Ryan Johnson as Chad
 Victoria Thaine as Sylvia
 Peter Flett as Mr. Kemperbee
 Amanda Smyth as Mrs. Babcock
 Ryan and Liam Falconer as Alvey Avery
 Bear the Dog as Otis

Voices 
 Bill Farmer and Richard Steven Horvitz as the vocal effects of the masked Otis
 Joyce Kurtz, Mona Marshall and Mary Matilyn Mouser as Alvey
 Neil Ross provided Alvey's deep voice

Uncredited 
 Mel Blanc as Woody Woodpecker and Barney Rubble (archival recordings and footage)
  Bill Roberts as Michigan J. Frog (archive footage)
 Don Messick as Bamm-Bamm Rubble (archive footage)
 Alan Reed as Fred Flintstone (archive footage)
 Brent Miller as Hot Shot (archive footage)

Production 
Not long after the release of The Mask, Nintendo Power announced that Jim Carrey would be returning in a sequel called The Mask II. The magazine held a contest where the first prize would be awarded a walk-on role in the film. Chuck Russell, who directed the original film, expressed his interest in a Mask sequel in his 1996 Laserdisc commentary. He was hoping Carrey would come back as the title character, along with Amy Yasbeck, who played reporter Peggy Brandt in the original. Russell decided to cut scenes when Peggy dies and leave the character open for the sequel. In a 1995 Barbara Walters Special, Carrey revealed that he was offered $10 million to star in The Mask II, but turned it down, because his experiences on Ace Ventura: When Nature Calls convinced him that reprising a character he'd previously played offered him no challenges as an actor. Due to Carrey declining to reprise his role, the project never came to fruition, and the concept for the sequel was completely changed. The winner of the failed contest was given $5000 and other prizes and was issued an apology in the final issue of Nintendo Power in 2012.

In 2001, it was reported that Lance Khazei was asked by New Line Cinema to do the script for a sequel to The Mask. Addressing the differences between the sequel and the original film, director Lawrence Guterman compared it to the differences between Alien and Aliens, stating that, "Son of the Mask is a completely different story."

Ben Stein reprises his role as Dr. Arthur Neuman from the original film, re-establishing the relationship between the mask and its creator, Loki. He is the only actor to appear in both films as well as in The Mask cartoon series. The dog's name, Otis, connects with the dog from the original film and comic book, Milo, as a reference to The Adventures of Milo and Otis. The naming of the Avery family pays homage to Tex Avery as its patriarch and the film's protagonist, Tim Avery, wants to be a cartoonist.

The film was shot at Fox Studios in Sydney. Principal photography began on August 18, 2003. The film had a budget of $84 million; New Line Cinema paid $20 million of that for the North America distribution rights while international partners paid the rest, as it was expected to do well in its home media release.

Jack Black and Ryan Reynolds were offered for the role of Tim Avery, but both turned it down.

In 2021, Jamie Kennedy released a series of in-depth videos on his YouTube channel about his experience making the film. He was offered the lead role after a couple of other projects he was to make with Warner Bros. did not go into production. He had initially turned down the offer to star due to scheduling conflicts with his television series The Jamie Kennedy Experiment.   Both the studio and network managed to work his schedule and he was signed. However, Kennedy was once again hesitant due to Tim only having minuscule time as the Mask and considered instead playing the role of Loki due to the versatile nature of the character. A chance encounter with Jim Carrey convinced him to take the role as well as talks with the director and producers who pitched the film as a romantic-comedy of a simple man going through relatable circumstances as a newly married man and sudden father. Kennedy admitted that he was also impressed with the special effects and hoped that the film would at least succeed in that aspect.

Kennedy stated that filming was exhausting primarily due to the Falconer twins and Bear the dog's constant maintenance. This combined with the heavy deadline and constant onset rewrites made it difficult to determine how the film would turn out. The original cut was roughly two hours long and only went through minor changes before getting screened for executives. Kennedy claimed that this version was much more accessible and had "scope and tones"; praising Guterman's attention to detail. However, the film was deemed "not funny" and was demanded to have thirty-eight minutes cut from the film. This resulted in what Kennedy described as an "ADHD clusterfuck" with numerous VFX-based scenes added that focused on Alvey and Otis.

Reception

Box office
The film earned back $59.9 million of its $84–100 million budget, making it a financial failure.

Critical response 
The site's consensus reads: "Overly frantic, painfully unfunny, and sorely missing the presence of Jim Carrey." The site ranked the film 75th in the 100 worst reviewed films of the 2000s. On Metacritic, the film has a score of 20 out of 100 based on 26 critics, indicating "generally unfavorable reviews". Audiences polled by CinemaScore gave the film an average grade of "B−" on an A+ to F scale.

In his review Richard Roeper stated, "In the five years I've been co-hosting this show, this is the closest I've ever come to walking out halfway through the film, and now that I look back on the experience, I wish I had." Roger Ebert gave the film 1.5 stars and stated, "What we basically have here is a license for the filmmakers to do whatever they want to do with the special effects, while the plot, like Wile E. Coyote, keeps running into the wall." He later named it the fifth worst film of 2005. On their television show, Ebert & Roeper, they gave the film "Two Thumbs Down". Lou Lumerick of the New York Post gave the film a zero-star rating and said that: "Parents who let their kids see this stinker should be brought up on abuse charges; so should the movie ratings board that let this suggestive mess slip by with a PG rating." Nell Minow of Common Sense Media gave the film 1/5 stars, writing: "This movie is dumb and loud, which some kids will confuse with entertaining, but others will just find it overwhelming."

Jim Schembri of The Sydney Morning Herald was more positive, saying that the film was "a bright, fast, kiddie-oriented lark with US TV comic Jamie Kennedy doing well as the beneficiary of the magical mask that turns anyone who wears it into a dazzling display of computer-animated effects."

Kennedy's response 
When asked in a 2012 interview whether the film's negative critical reaction had damaged his morale in wanting to do another project like this, Kennedy replied to the interviewer, "Yes. You got me right after a batch of bad interviews so I'm going to be honest with you about this. It does because I'm just being killed, absolutely killed... But honestly, doing this movie is an interesting experience because I just came off my show and Malibu's Most Wanted where I had a good amount of control. And then in this movie I didn't have any control. I just can't do that. I have to have my voice in there. If I can't, I'm just going to be like I'm doing someone else's thing. I have to have some of my voice because I have my own experiences that I lived through. All I can do is just try to make things independently. That's the only way you can do it. The only way you can do that is if you're a huge, huge, huge star. I'm not there yet. I'm just like a working actor." The poor reception of Son of the Mask, which affected Kennedy personally, inspired him to co-create the documentary film Heckler, an examination of both hecklers and professional critics.

Accolades 
It was the most nominated film at the 2005 Golden Raspberry Awards with eight, winning for Worst Remake or Sequel, and won several 2005 Stinkers Bad Movie Awards, including Worst Actor (Jamie Kennedy), Worst Sequel, and Worst Couple.

 In a 2007 countdown of the 94 "worst to best" comic book to film adaptations Rotten Tomatoes listed the film 94th.

Video game 
A video game based on the film was released on mobile phones on February 10, 2005. The game was published and developed by Indiagames.

Possible sequel
On the possibility of a third film, Mike Richardson has said, "We've been talking about reviving The Mask, both in film and in comics. We've had a couple of false starts".

See also 
 List of films considered the worst
 Seed of Chucky (2004), avoid comparison to the film
 List of live-action films based on cartoons and comics
 List of films based on Dark Horse Comics

References

External links 

 
 

2005 films
2005 comedy films
2000s children's comedy films
2000s English-language films
2000s fantasy comedy films
2000s pregnancy films
2000s screwball comedy films
2000s superhero comedy films
American films with live action and animation
American children's comedy films
American fantasy comedy films
American pregnancy films
American screwball comedy films
American slapstick comedy films
English-language German films
Films about babies
Films based on Dark Horse Comics
Films based on Norse mythology
Films directed by Lawrence Guterman
Films set in 2004
Films shot in Australia
German children's comedy films
German fantasy comedy films
German pregnancy films
Live-action films based on comics
The Mask (franchise)
American sequel films
German sequel films
Dark Horse Entertainment films
New Line Cinema films
Films scored by Randy Edelman
Films produced by Scott Kroopf
Golden Raspberry Award winning films
2000s American films
2000s German films